Coelopinae is a subfamily of kelp flies in the family Coelopidae.

Classification
Tribe Coelopini Hendel, 1910
Genus Coelopa Meigen, 1830
Subgenus Coelopa Meigen, 1830
Subgenus Fucomyia Haliday, 1837
Subgenus Neocoelopa Malloch, 1933
Tribe Coelopellini McAlpine, 1991
Genus Amma Classification McAlpine, 1991
Genus Beaopterus Lamb, 1909
Genus Coelopella Malloch, 1933
Genus Icaridion Lamb, 1909Halteres absent and the wings are reduced to strips. New Zealand.
Genus Rhis McAlpine, 1991
Genus This McAlpine, 1991
Tribe Glumini McAlpine, 1991
Genus Chaetocoelopa Malloch, 1933
Genus Coelopina Malloch, 1933
Genus Dasycoelopa Malloch, 1933
Genus Gluma McAlpine, 1991
Genus Malacomyia Haliday in Westwood, 1840 (sometimes placed in Dryomyzidae)

References

Coelopidae
Diptera subfamilies